Pakdasht County is in Tehran province, Iran. The capital of the county is the city of Pakdasht. At the 2006 census, the county's population was 240,841 in 61,234 households. The following census in 2011 counted 291,397 people in 81,402 households. At the 2016 census, the county's population was 350,966 in 103,542 households. Pakdasht is a center of flower production in Iran. About 800,000 hectares of greenhouses for producing flowers exist in this area.

Administrative divisions

The population history and structural changes of Pakdasht County's administrative divisions over three consecutive censuses are shown in the following table. The latest census shows two districts, six rural districts, and three cities.

References

 

Counties of Tehran Province